Steven Harvey Goldmann (August 18, 1961 – April 30, 2015) was a Canadian music video and film director. He directed over 200 music videos. Goldmann also directed the movies Broken Bridges and Trailer Park of Terror, and additionally directed several television programs. Goldmann died of cancer on April 30, 2015.

Career

1990-1999
Goldmann came to international prominence and was recognized as a director to watch in 1998-1999, winning the triple crown of the country music video industry.  His innovative direction of Faith Hill’s This Kiss took top prize with the Country Music Association, Academy of Country Music, and TNN Music City News Best Video of the Year. In addition, he was awarded Video of the Year by Country Music Television (CMT) and Nashville Music Awards for This Kiss. Goldmann also received the 1998 MusicRow Awards Best Video of the Year and a Telly Award (Kathy Mattea’s I’m On Your Side), the 1998 MVPA (Music Video Production Association) Award for Country Video Of The Year (Mary Chapin Carpenter’s Better To Dream Of You), and got to work with one of his heroes, Bruce Springsteen. It was by all measurements a year to remember and a year that brought Goldmann to national prominence. It capped off a run of recognition in the music video world that started with consecutive  CMT Director of the Year Awards in 1996 and 1997, and ended with Rolling Stone Magazine sighting Goldmann’s Shania Twain video for You Win My Love, one of six he directed for her, as the 5th most important/influential video of the 90’s.

2000-2013
Using a script by J. Jacob Potashnik, Goldmann directed 50 Odd Dollars, a film noir inspired by singer/songwriter Fred Eaglesmith’s recording of the same name. Other films that he directed include the 2003 release of the fantasy musical Our Country, an IMAX film for Gaylord Entertainment.  Goldmann both wrote and directed the large format film which featured musical icons such as Lyle Lovett, The Dixie Chicks, Dwight Yoakam, Alan Jackson, Martina McBride, Dolly Parton, and well over thirty other stars.

In 2004, Goldmann directed several episodes of Missing about a psychic FBI agent starring Vivica Fox for Lifetime and Lions Gate Entertainment where he brought a new look to an integral part the show - the psychic’s visions.

Goldmann also directed the feature film Broken Bridges, starring Toby Keith, Kelly Preston, Tess Harper, and Burt Reynolds for Paramount/CMT FILMS. Later, in late 2007, Goldmann completed the horror film Trailer Park of Terror with Producer Jonathan Bogner.

Notable awards
1993 (CMT) COUNTRY MUSIC TELEVISION Director of the Year
1996 Collin Raye's I Think About You - ACADEMY OF COUNTRY MUSIC Video of the Year
1996 (CMT) COUNTRY MUSIC TELEVISION Director of the Year
1996 Shania Twain's (If You're Not in It for Love) I'm Outta Here! - Canadian Country Music Awards' CMT Video of the Year, 1996 SILVER CLIO AWARD
1997 Kathy Mattea's 455 Rocket - COUNTRY MUSIC ASSOCIATION Video of the Year, 1997 NASHVILLE MUSIC AWARD Video of the Year
1997  (CMT) COUNTRY MUSIC TELEVISION Director of the Year
1998-1999 Faith Hill's This Kiss video - TNN Music City News Best Video Of The Year, Nashville Music Awards, and CMT's Video Of The Year
1998 Kathy Mattea's I'm On Your Side video - MusicRow Awards Best Video Of The Year, Telly Award
1998 Mary Chapin Carpenter's Better To Dream Of You video - MVPA Award
2000 50 Odd Dollars - ALABAMA/UNA FILM FESTIVAL - Gold Lion for Best in Show & Best Short, HOUSTON FILM FESTIVAL Best Short Subject 	
2003 Alan Jackson's Drive (For Daddy Gene) video - ACM's Video of the Year award
2007 Emerson Drive's Moments - Canadian Country Music Awards' CMT Video of the Year

Videography

Films directed
Trailer Park of Terror (2007) – Summit Entertainment
Broken Bridges (2006) – CMT/Paramount
Our Country (2003) – Gaylord Entertainment

Television programs directed
Missing – 4 episodes – Lifetime/Lions Gate
Bruce Springsteen - A Secret History – BBC 2 Documentary
BreakOUT! – Pilot – Concert/Reality show – MTV-2
2001 Canadian Country Music Awards - CBC
Stampede – Variety - CBC

Music videos directed
187 music videos are currently listed here.

References

External links

 Steven Goldmann's interview with Dai from HorrorNews.net
 https://books.google.com/books?id=_gwEAAAAMBAJ&lpg=PA90&ots=2dTTcwD5eV&dq=Billboard%20steven%20goldmann&pg=PA90#v=onepage&q=Billboard%20steven%20goldmann&f=false

Canadian music video directors
Canadian film directors
1961 births
2015 deaths